Anton Raenel Jopseph Blackwood (born 18 August 1991) is a former professional footballer who is now working for Tottenham Hotspur in Asia as part of the club's global football development programme.  He is a former Antigua and Barbuda international.

Club career
Born in London, Blackwood's early career was at Arsenal, before he was released in 2009. He then joined Tottenham Hotspur on a one-year contract.

He played one league game for Aveley in October 2011, then moved to St Albans City in February 2012, and Barton Rovers in September 2012. In February 2013 he trialled with American club Tampa Bay Rowdies.

At the start of the 2013–14 season Blackwood signed for Thurrock. He was released at the turn of 2013. In the summer of 2014 he was signed by Cheshunt, and by Haringey Borough in the summer of 2015.

International career
Blackwood made his debut for the Antigua and Barbuda national team on 29 February 2012 in a friendly match against Trinidad & Tobago. He was injured and had to be substituted after 16 minutes of the match.

References

1991 births
Living people
English sportspeople of Antigua and Barbuda descent
Antigua and Barbuda footballers
English footballers
Association football defenders
Antigua and Barbuda international footballers
Arsenal F.C. players
Tottenham Hotspur F.C. players
Aveley F.C. players
St Albans City F.C. players
Barton Rovers F.C. players
Thurrock F.C. players
Cheshunt F.C. players
Haringey Borough F.C. players